Monmouthshire is a county and principal area of Wales. It borders Torfaen and Newport to the west; Herefordshire and Gloucestershire (in England) to the east; and Powys to the north. The largest town is Abergavenny, with other large settlements being Chepstow, Monmouth, and Usk. The present county was formed under the Local Government (Wales) Act 1994, and comprises some sixty percent of the historic county. Between 1974 and 1996, the county was known by the ancient title of Gwent, recalling the medieval Welsh kingdom. The county is 850 km2 (330 sq mi) in extent, with a population of 95,200 .

In the United Kingdom, the term "listed building" refers to a building or other structure officially designated as being of special architectural, historical or cultural significance. Listing was begun by a provision in the Town and Country Planning Act 1947. Once a building is listed, strict limitations are imposed on the modifications allowed to its structure or fittings. In Wales, authority for listing under the Planning (Listed Buildings and Conservation Areas) Act 1990 lies with Cadw. Listed buildings are categorised into three grades:
 Grade I – buildings of exceptional interest, only 2.5% of listed buildings in England and Wales are Grade I;
 Grade II* – buildings of particular importance with more than special interest, 5.8% of listed buildings in England and Wales are Grade II*;
 Grade II – buildings of special interest; 91.7% of all listed buildings in England and Wales are in this class.

There are 53 Grade I listed buildings in Monmouthshire. These consist of twenty-four churches, a priory and an abbey, eight castles, seven houses, two bridges, a barn, a cross, a farm, a folly, a gatehouse, a hotel, a municipal building, a stables, and two elements of town walls. The journalist Simon Jenkins notes the county's "fine collection" of castles, mostly dating from the Norman invasion of Wales, and describes Chepstow as "the glory of medieval south Wales". The castle at Raglan is later, dating from the mid-fifteenth century. The fortified bridge over the River Monnow at Monmouth is the only remaining fortified river bridge in the country with its gate tower standing on the bridge, and has been described as "arguably the finest surviving medieval bridge in Britain". Monmouthshire has a more "modest" range of churches, although that at Bettws Newydd has "perhaps the most complete rood arrangement remaining in any church in England and Wales". The county's Grade I listed abbey, at Tintern, became a focal point of the Wye Tour in the late-eighteenth century. The Monmouthshire writer and artist, Fred Hando, chronicled the history of the county in some 800 newspaper articles written between the 1920s and the 1960s and published in the South Wales Argus, focusing on "the little places of a shy county". Among the Grade I listed structures Hando described were "the tallest house in Monmouthshire" at Treowen, "the most crooked church in Britain" at Cwmyoy, and the Arts and Crafts sgraffito at Llanfair Kilgeddin.

Notable people associated with Monmouthshire's Grade I listed buildings include Henry V, born at Monmouth Castle in 1387; the medieval soldier and statesman William Marshal, 1st Earl of Pembroke, who undertook major construction at Chepstow Castle; and Henry Somerset, 1st Marquess of Worcester, who entertained his king at Raglan, and lost the castle at the end of the First English Civil War. William Wordsworth undertook the Wye Tour in 1798, composing Lines Written a Few Miles above Tintern Abbey during his visit, and Walter Savage Landor sought, unsuccessfully, to establish a landed estate at Llanthony Priory. Archdeacon Coxe's record of his journey to Llanthony in the spring of 1799 provides an illustration of the hazards of travelling in Wales at this time: "I would not recommend timid persons to pass this way in a carriage, for in the whole course of my travels, I seldom met with one more inconvenient and unsafe". In 1840, the Chartist leader John Frost and two colleagues were tried at the Shire Hall in Monmouth and sentenced to be hanged, drawn and quartered, the last such sentences to be passed in Britain. A statue in front of the Shire Hall commemorates Charles Stewart Rolls, the aviator and entrepreneur who was the first Briton to be killed in a plane crash.

The architecture of the county was first systematically covered by William Coxe in his two-volume, An Historical Tour in Monmouthshire, published in 1801. Coxe's Preface explains the Tour's genesis; "The present work owes its origin to an accidental excursion in Monmouthshire, in company with my friend Sir Richard Hoare, during the autumn of 1798. I was struck with the picturesque ruins of ancient castles, and I was animated with the view of mansions distinguished by the residence of illustrious persons". A detailed county history was undertaken by Sir Joseph Bradney, in his A History of Monmouthshire from the Coming of the Normans into Wales down to the Present Time; published in the early 20th century. More recent studies include those of the architectural historian John Newman, in his Gwent/Monmouthshire volume of the Pevsner Buildings of Wales series; and, most exhaustively, by Sir Cyril Fox and Lord Raglan, in their three-volume study, Monmouthshire Houses. The last was described by the architectural historian Peter Smith as "one of the most remarkable studies of vernacular architecture yet made in the British Isles, a landmark, in its own field, as significant as Darwin's Origin of Species".

Buildings

See also

 Listed buildings in Wales
 Grade I listed buildings in Herefordshire
 Grade I listed buildings in Forest of Dean
 Grade I listed buildings in Newport
 Grade I listed buildings in Torfaen
 Grade II* listed buildings in Blaenau Gwent – there are currently no Grade I listed buildings in Blaenau Gwent
 Grade I listed buildings in Powys
 Grade II* listed buildings in Monmouthshire
 Scheduled Monuments in Monmouthshire
 Registered historic parks and gardens in Monmouthshire

External links
Click here to see an interactive OpenStreetMap with locations of all Grade I listed buildings, Monmouthshire-wide, for which coordinates are included in the list-articles linked above.

Notes

References

Sources
 

 
 
 

 

 
 
 
 
 
 
 
 

 
Monmouthshire I
Buildings and structures in Monmouthshire
History of Monmouthshire